Record-keeping for punting yards began in 1939, when Parker Hall led the National Football League (NFL) with 2,369 punting yards, while playing for the Cleveland Rams (now known as the Los Angeles Rams). Hall would lead the league in punting yards the following season as well, becoming the first player to accomplish the feat in consecutive seasons. Dave Zastudil holds the record for punting yards in a season; he set the record at 5,209 punting yards in 2012, while playing with the Arizona Cardinals. 

Although many other players have been able to lead the league in two consecutive seasons, John James is the only player to have the led the league in three consecutive seasons (1976–1978). James and Shane Lechler share the record of most seasons leading the league in punting yards, with four each. James led the league in 1974, in addition to his aforementioned three-year stretch; he played with the Atlanta Falcons in all four of those seasons. Meanwhile, Lechler lead the league in 2003, 2008, and 2009 (while with the Oakland Raiders), and in 2017, while playing with the Houston Texans. Johnny Hekker was the most recent player to accomplish this feat, leading in 2015, while playing for the St. Louis Rams, and again in 2016, when the team relocated to Los Angeles.

Among punting yards performances that did not lead the league, Chad Stanley has the most with 4,720 for the Texans in 2002. Marquette King's 4,930 punting yards for the Oakland Raiders in 2014 is the most punting yards a player has had without setting the single-season record.

Sammy Baugh led the league in yards per punt five times in his career (1940–1943, 1945). Lechler is the only other player to lead the league in yards per punt four times (2003, 2004, 2007, 2009). Baugh's four consecutive years leading the league (1940–1943) is also notable; no other player has led the league more than twice consecutively. The most recent player to do so was Lechler in 2003 and 2004. Baugh set the record for yards per punt at 51.4 in 1940. The 50.0 yards per punt mark would not be reached again until Donnie Jones achieved the feat in 2008. Ryan Stonehouse would surpass Baugh's yards per punt record, setting the new benchmark at 53.1 in 2022. Only Lechler has averaged 50.0 or more yards per punt in a single-season on multiple occasions (2009 and 2011).

Total punting yards leaders

The following is the season-by-season listing:

Other league leaders

All-America Football Conference (AAFC)

American Football League (AFL)

Yards per punt leaders

 

The following is the season-by-season listing:

Highest single-seasons

Total punting yards

The following list displays the 25 highest single-season punting yards figures in NFL history. Unless otherwise noted, the listed players led the respective season with their performances.

See also
 List of National Football League career punting yards leaders
 List of National Football League career punts leaders

Notes

References

Punting yards leaders
National Football League records and achievements
National Football League lists